The Dreft Star Playhouse was a daytime radio program in the United States, presenting adaptations of romantic movies in serial form. It was broadcast on NBC June 28, 1943 – March 30, 1945. The show's original title was Hollywood Theatre of the Air, but that changed effective October 18, 1943, "[t]o avoid conflict with similar titles."

Format
The Dreft Star Playhouse was classified as "prestige drama" by one source. It "attempted to accomplish in a five-times-a-week soap-opera format what Lux Radio Theatre had done in the nighttime format." Radio historian John Dunning called the program "a noble experiment, devised to see if daytime radio would support a show of purported nighttime quality."

Programs presenting adaptations of movies proliferated on nighttime radio. Lux Radio Theatre may have been the best known; others included Warner Brothers' Academy Theatre, The Screen Guild Theater, Hollywood Premiere, Hollywood Star Time, Hollywood Mystery Time, Hollywood Star Preview, Academy Award and Hollywood Star Playhouse.

In contrast to the evening programs, which limited an adaptation of a movie to a single broadcast, The Dreft Star Playhouse presented its adaptations in the form of serials whose duration varied. Perhaps the longest was "Dark Victory," starring Cathy Lewis, which "ran two months in daily quarter-hour doses." (Note: Dunning book incorrectly credits Gail Patrick, who actually did "Marked Woman" the previous month).

Productions and players
Dunning called The Dreft Star Playhouse "an ambitious undertaking," noting that the program spent "up to $3,000 per week for 'name' talent." Jane Wyman starred in its first production, "Bachelor Mother." Other titles and stars that listeners heard on the program included the following:
"The Magnificent Ambersons" – Agnes Moorehead 
"Hold Back the Dawn" – Maureen O'Sullivan
"Take a Letter, Darling" – Mary Astor
"Marked Woman" – Gail Patrick
"Suspicion" – Margo.

References 

1940s American radio programs
American radio dramas
1943 radio programme debuts
1945 radio programme endings
NBC radio programs
Radio programs based on films